Don Manuel Luis de Godoy y Tudó, Álvarez de Faria Rios y Catalán (March 29, 1805 in Madrid – August 24, 1871 in Madrid) was a Spanish aristocrat, son of Manuel de Godoy, Prince of the Peace and his second wife Josefa de Tudó, 1st Countess of Castillo Fiel, Dama de Honor de Su Majestad la Reina y Dama Noble de la Orden de Maria Luisa.

He inherited his mother's titles and / or representations and solely his father's Italian titles and dignities, the one which could only be used through male line, and was 2nd Principe de Bassano y Principe Romano de Godoy (1851), 2nd Conde de Castillo Fiel with a Coat of Arms of de Tudó (of which was passed a successory Royal Order on October 28, 1870, not getting to receive Royal Dispatch for having died almost subsequently), Knight of the Habit of the Spanish Military Order of Santiago (1867), Bailly Great Cross of the Order of St. John of Jerusalem, Commander of the Order of Christ in Rome, and the Order of Avis in Portugal, etc.

Marriage and children
He married in Paris, November 15, 1827, with María Carolina Crowe y O’Donovan O’Neill (London, 1807 – Paris, December 4, 1878), an Irish-Spanish (who was maid of honour to the Empress Eugénie de Montijo), the daughter of Sir Lawrence Crowe, Lord of St Stephen's Green House, and Lucinda O’Donovan O’Neill, both from Dublin, Ireland, and had five children:

 Manuel de Godoy di Bassano, 3rd Prince Godoy di Bassano
 Matilde de Godoy di Bassano, 4th Countess of Castillo Fiel
 Josefa de Godoy di Bassano, 2nd Viscountess of Rocafuerte
 Don Carlos de Godoy de Bassano y Crowe dei principi Godoy di Bassano, (Roma, December 12, 1835 – La Habana, March 1, 1862), married in 1859 with Doña Francisca Díaz Cañizares y de Pina. His only daughter, Doña Francisca de Godoy y Diaz Cañizares, still living in 1871 in San Jose de Arroyo Blanco, Santo Spiritus, La Habana, Cuba, where she died later.
 Donna María Luisa Cristina (Marie Louise Christine) de Godoy de Bassano y Crowe, de Tudó y O'Donovan, dei principi Godoy di Bassano, (Marseille, January 12, 1839 – Paris, January 28, 1880), married firstly in Paris, August 4, 1859 Ernest Alexandre Louis Charles Napoléon Auguste, Prinz von Looz und Corswarem (Bonlez, September 5, 1834 – Bonlez, December 12, 1868), son of Charles Franz Wilhelm Ferdinand 6th Herzog von Looz und Corswarem, and wife Hermine Anna Gertrude Jacqueline Baronne van Lockhorst, and had three children, secondly with William Abbott, without issue, and thirdly with Richard Seaver, Major of the British Army, without issue:
 Charles Emmanuel Ernest Alexander Arnold 8th Herzog von Looz und Corswarem (in succession of his uncle the 7th Herzog Charles Leopold August Ludwig Philipp, who deceased leaving only female issue now extinct) (Chateau de Niel, Paris, April 15, 1860 – August 8, 1946), etc., married in Paris, January 25, 1890, annulled by trial of February 20, 1891, Maria Helena de Portugal de Faria, 1st Pontificious Countess de Portugal de Faria (Lisbon, March 19, 1866 – November 20, 1957), daughter of Augusto de Faria, 1st Visconde de Faria, and wife Maria do Ó Barreiros Arrobas de Portugal da Silveira de Barros e Vasconcelos, without issue
Manuela Prinzessin von Looz und Corswarem (Chateau de Niel, Paris, November 5, 1861 – January 31, 1919), married on June 13, 1881 Henri André Othon, Baron de Bogaerde de Terbruggen (? – September 26, 1896)
Ludwig Prinz von Looz und Corswarem (Bonlez, Belgique, March 20, 1867 – July 15, 1921), unmarried and without issue

References 
 Affonso, Domingos de Araújo and Valdez, Rui Dique Travassos, Livro de Oiro da Nobreza (3 volumes), Volume 1, p. 491-8, Lisbon, 1938.
 Zúquete, Afonso Eduardo Martins, Nobreza de Portugal e do Brasil (3 Volumes), Volume Second, p. 569-71, Lisbon, 1960.
 Instituto de Sala

1805 births
1871 deaths
19th-century Spanish nobility
19th-century Italian nobility
Manuel 02
Manuel 02